PK-2 Lower Chitralis a constituency for the Khyber Pakhtunkhwa Assembly of the Khyber Pakhtunkhwa province of Pakistan. It covers the area of Lower Chitral District.

2018 Pakistan General Election

See also
 PK-1 Upper Chitral
 PK-3 Swat-I

References

External links 
 Khyber Pakhtunkhwa Assembly's official website
 Election Commission of Pakistan's official website
 Awaztoday.com Search Result
 Election Commission Pakistan Search Result

Khyber Pakhtunkhwa Assembly constituencies
Chitral District